Irma Rapuzzi (12 April 1910 – 3 April 2018) was a French politician.

Biography
She was born on 12 April 1910 in Cadolive, as the daughter of a miner. She began her career in politics in 1947 when she became a municipal councilor in Marseille. After this she was elected senator of Bouches-du-Rhône and went on to hold many other political positions in her life. She was the godmother of French politician Sylvie Andrieux. She turned 100 in April 2010.

Rapuzzi died in April 2018 in her home, nine days shy of her 108th birthday.

See also
List of centenarians (politicians and civil servants)

References

1910 births
2018 deaths
French centenarians
French Senators of the Fifth Republic
Senators of Bouches-du-Rhône
Women members of the Senate (France)
20th-century French politicians
20th-century French women politicians
People from Bouches-du-Rhône
Women centenarians